Henrietta Hutton (née Cooke) (1939–1963) was a British ornithologist and a founding member of the Oxford University Women's Exploration Club. The Henrietta Hutton Research Grant was established in Henrietta's name in 1964 with a financial endowment of about £5,000, which has been administered by the Royal Geographical Society (with IBG) from 1964 to present. The grants are used to fund geographical fieldwork by undergraduate and postgraduate students. Originally awarded to female geographers from the University of Oxford, the awards are now open to male and female applicants from any UK Higher Education Institution. To date, over 130 students have received a Henrietta Hutton Research Grant to support overseas geographical fieldwork.

On 15 May 2014, an event was held at the Royal Geographical Society (with IBG), to celebrate 50 years of the Henrietta Hutton Research Grant and the contribution the awards have made to support female geographers. The grants were featured on BBC Radio 4 Woman's Hour, broadcast 16 May 2014.

References 

1939 births
1963 deaths
British ornithologists
Women ornithologists
20th-century British zoologists